Löberöd is a bimunicipal locality situated in Eslöv Municipality and Höör Municipality in Skåne County, Sweden with 1,127 inhabitants in 2010.

References 

Populated places in Eslöv Municipality
Populated places in Höör Municipality
Populated places in Skåne County